The 2020–21 St. Cloud State Huskies men's ice hockey season was the 86th season of play for the program, the 24th at the Division I level and the 8th in the NCHC conference. The Huskies represented St. Cloud State University and were coached by Brett Larson, in his 3rd season.

Season
As a result of the ongoing COVID-19 pandemic the entire college ice hockey season was delayed. Because the NCAA had previously announced that all winter sports athletes would retain whatever eligibility they possessed through at least the following year, none of St. Cloud State's players would lose a season of play. However, the NCAA also approved a change in its transfer regulations that would allow players to transfer and play immediately rather than having to sit out a season, as the rules previously required.

Regular season
Due to ongoing COVID-19 concerns, St. Cloud joined the rest of the NCHC in Omaha, Nebraska for the first three weeks of the season. The Huskies started well, winning their first three matches and used some of the games to give their backup netminders a turn in goal. From the beginning, however, Dávid Hrenák was the team's go-to goalie. He helped the team swiftly climb into the top-20 and provided the team with the needed support to overcome then-number-one North Dakota. The win put St. Cloud on the map and by the end of the NCHC's Omaha bubble, the Huskies were in the top-10.

St. Cloud got a chance to prove they were worthy of their ranking with four consecutive games against #4 Minnesota Duluth. The Huskies lost the first match but then won three in a row and jumped into the top-5. Aside from the honor of being ranked so highly after beginning the season unranked, the Huskies were guaranteed a spot in the NCAA tournament if they could maintain their position. Unfortunately, the very next weekend they were swept by Western Michigan. The losses didn't cost STC too much, since the NCHC is typically regarded as the best conference in college hockey (St. Cloud only fell two spots).

St. Cloud went through a bit of a rough patch in February, splitting series against two teams with losing records, and found themselves in a race for second place with UMD. The two ended the regular season with a home-and-home series over two weekends and when the Bulldogs took the first game they were just one point behind St. Cloud in the standings. The Huskies jumped out to a huge lead in their final regular season game, leading 3–0 after 20 minutes, but Duluth fought back in the final two periods to tie the game. Not wanting to let Duluth have a chance, Easton Brodzinski scored the winning goal just 17 seconds into overtime, giving the Huskies the second seed.

NCHC Tournament
With the entire conference tournament being played at the Ralph Engelstad Arena, there was no home advantage for the Huskies, but the team was able to avoid playing Western Michigan in the quarterfinals (WMU had won the season series 2–4). Instead, St. Cloud was nearly overcome by a tremendous performance by Colorado College's Matt Vernon. STC outshout CC 44–7 in the game but still found themselves down as the second period wound down. Vernon only allowed two goals while his team was completely outplayed and St. Cloud never took the pressure off. The Tigers couldn't even get a shot on goal in the third and the Huskies' oppressive defense carried them to the victory. In the semifinal, St. Cloud met Minnesota Duluth for the seventh time that season. The two teams fought a mostly even first period but STC carried a 2–1 lead. The Huskies dominated the middle frame, outshooting the Bulldogs 18–6, but the teams exchanged goals to leave St. Cloud with a 1-goal lead after 40 minutes. St. Cloud put up a defensive wall in the third and were able to hold UMD off of the scoresheet to win the game and head to the title match.

The Huskies were once again able to play well in the first two periods, leading 2–1 after one and then pushing the pace in the second. Unfortunately for St. Cloud, North Dakota possessed a far better offense than Duluth and when the Fighting Hawks got some power play opportunities in the third they took full advantage. UND scored three times in just over two minutes to take the lead and then added an empty-net goal to down the Huskies 5–3.

NCAA tournament
The second-place finish resulted in St. Cloud State being ranked 7th by the NCAA selection committee and the team received was set to face Boston University in the regional semifinals. The first period was marked by BU killing off a 5-minute major penalty and, when the Terriers opened the scoring 8 seconds into the second, it appeared that it may be their night. St. Cloud continued to pile shots on goal and were finally able to break through after the half-way point of the game. Once the Huskies broke through a wave of goals followed; four goals were scored in less than four minutes, three from St. Cloud State, and the Huskies found themselves up 3–2 entering the third. Chase Brand took a major penalty for elbowing Jay O'Brien in the head and gave BU a chance to get back into the game. Instead, Jami Krannila wound up scoring on a penalty shot less than a minute later and the goal from St. Cloud seemed to take the steam out of the Terriers. The penalty ended without another goal and Hrenák held BU scoreless in the third while the Huskies scored twice more to run away with a 6–2 win.

In their second game the Huskies met Boston College, who had been advanced due to the forced withdrawal of Notre Dame. despite coming in cold, BC scored first and led after one but, for the fifth consecutive game, St. Cloud was an absolute terror in the second period. The Huskies outshot Boston College 20–7 and reeled off three goals to take a commanding lead. The defense proved stout once again and held the Eagles scoreless over the final 45 minutes of the game to send St. Cloud State to their second Frozen Four since joining Division I in 1987. Unfortunately for St. Cloud, not everything had turned up roses. the team's leading goal scorer, Easton Brodzinski, broke his femur in the game and would miss the team's Frozen Four run.

Frozen Four
Two weeks later the Huskies opened the Frozen Four as one of three Minnesota teams and faced the highest-remaining seed, Minnesota State. After exchanging power play markers, St. Cloud took a 2–1 lead into the second period. The Huskies increased their lead to two less than three minutes into the middle frame, but this game saw the Huskies' script change. MSU came charging back in the second, more than doubling St. Cloud's shot total, and scored twice in the second half of the period to tie the game. The Mavericks then scored early in the third to take the lead and looked to have all the momentum, but St. Cloud was able to fight back. After tying the score with under 10 minutes to play, St. Cloud fought a mostly even duel with Minnesota State for the rest of the game but, with less than a minute to play, Nolan Walker deflected a point shot over the shoulder of Dryden McKay and put the Huskies ahead. They were able to hold off the Mavericks in the final few second and reached the program's first ever championship game.

In the title game, St. Cloud got off to a slow start against Massachusetts, recording only 3 shots in the first period. While the Huskies found themselves down by just a goal as the first neared its end, there was a bit of controversy when a UMass player grabbed the puck and threw it out of his defensive zone. On replay it appeared to be worth of a delay-of-game penalty but nothing was called. Shortly thereafter, the Minutemen scored their second goal of the game on what was likely an offside play. Despite the referees reviewing the goal, it was allowed to stand and the St. Cloud team was livid. The Huskies were able to calm down during intermission and came out firing in the third. After getting their second power play opportunity, the team had a chance to climb back into the game. Instead, the Huskies were caught after a bad turnover and Philip Lagunov put UMass ahead by 3 after a highlight-reel goal. The short-handed marker left many of St. Cloud's players with slumped shoulders. Before the period was out the Minutemen scored again on their own power play and essentially put the game out of reach. While it can't be known what difference the missed calls in the first or the absence of Brodzinski made, Massachusetts was the better team throughout the game and St. Could would have to wait for another year.

Trevor Zins sat out the season.

Departures

Recruiting

Roster
As of March 1, 2021.

Standings

Schedule and results

|-
!colspan=12 style=";" | Regular season

|-
!colspan=12 style=";" | 

|-
!colspan=12 ! style=""; |

Scoring statistics

Goaltending statistics

Rankings

USCHO did not release a poll in week 20.

Awards and honors

Players drafted into the NHL

2021 NHL Entry Draft

† incoming freshman

References

St. Cloud State Huskies men's ice hockey seasons
St. Cloud State
St. Cloud State
St. Cloud State
St. Cloud State
St. Cloud State
St. Cloud State